Water ragwort is a common name for several plants and may refer to:

Jacobaea aquatica
Senecio hydrophilus, native to western North America